Tylopilus badiceps is a bolete fungus in the family Boletaceae native to North America. It was described in 1900 as Boletus badiceps by Charles Horton Peck, and transferred to the genus Tylopilus in 1971 by Alexander H. Smith and Harry Delbert Thiers. It is a good edible mushroom.

See also
List of North American boletes

References

External links

badiceps
Edible fungi
Fungi described in 1900
Fungi of the United States
Fungi without expected TNC conservation status